Natel Kenar-e Sofla Rural District is a rural district (dehestan) in the Central District of Nur County, Mazandaran Province, Iran. At the 2006 census, its population was 2,975, in 818 families. The rural district has two villages.

References 

 Rural Districts of Mazandaran Province
Nur County